"These Nights" is a collaboration single by Indonesian rapper Rich Brian and South Korean singer Chungha released on October 3, 2019, by 88rising. The track serves as one of the lead singles in 88rising's compilation album, Head in the Clouds II, released on October 11, 2019 through 88rising Records and 12Tone Music.

Background and music
Music and photo teasers for the song were released in the weeks prior to the official release of the single. The track was written by Chungha, Slanger, Montana Wayne Best, McCulloch Reid Sutphin, Jordan Orvosh and Rich Brian.

Musically, "These Nights" is a sophisticated track with an old-school style that features a memorable synthesizer sound. It has been described as a song about existing for the nighttime and seizing the memorable moments one can make with their lover. The song serves as a stark difference to Brian’s debut song, "Dat $tick" (2016) and includes passionate modulated crooning rather than a harsh anti-authoritative attitude.

Music video
The single was released through a hypnotizing music video that features the pair as they speed along a motorcycle, dancing together. Filmed in Indonesia, it also shows Rich Brian rocking a bold mullet while holding an '80s-style brick phone. As Rich Brian comically locks eyes with the camera, the scene then transits to one where Chungha and him are riding a motorcycle into the night.

Release history

References

2019 songs
2019 singles
Chungha songs
Rich Brian songs
Songs written by Rich Brian